Deh Kohneh-e Dowbalutan (also Romanized as Deh Kohneh-e Dowbalūṭān) is a village in Tolbozan Rural District, Golgir District, Masjed Soleyman County, Khuzestan Province, Iran. At the 2006 census, its population was 20, in 5 families.

References 

Populated places in Masjed Soleyman County